Gimsøy is a former municipality in Nordland county, Norway.  The  municipality existed from 1856 until its dissolution in 1964.  It was located in the northwestern part of what is now Vågan Municipality.  The municipality consisted mainly of the island of Gimsøya as well as the western part of the larger neighboring island of Austvågøya.  The municipalities also included 407 other small islands as well as hundreds of little islets and skerries, all of which are located in the Lofoten archipelago.  The administrative centre was located at the village of Gimsøysand, where the Gimsøy Church is located.

History
The municipality of Gimsøy was established in 1856 when it was split off from the municipality of Vågan. Initially, Gimsøy had a population of 987.  During the 1960s, there were many municipal mergers across Norway due to the work of the Schei Committee.  On 1 January 1964, the municipality of Gimsøy (population: 1,551) was merged with the neighboring town of Svolvær (population: 3,952) and the municipality of Vågan (population: 4,820) to form the new, larger municipality of Vågan.

Name
The municipality (originally the parish) is named after the island of Gimsøya since the first Gimsøy Church was built there. The island was historical used for sheep farming.

Government
While it existed, this municipality was responsible for primary education (through 10th grade), outpatient health services, senior citizen services, unemployment, social services, zoning, economic development, and municipal roads. During its existence, this municipality was governed by a municipal council of elected representatives, which in turn elected a mayor.

Municipal council
The municipal council  of Gimsøy was made up of representatives that were elected to four year terms.  The party breakdown of the final municipal council was as follows:

See also
List of former municipalities of Norway

References

Vågan
Former municipalities of Norway
1856 establishments in Norway
1964 disestablishments in Norway